The secret royal inspector in Korea was a temporary position unique to the Joseon Dynasty, in which an undercover official directly appointed by the king was sent to local provinces to monitor government officials and look after the populace while traveling incognito. Unlike regular inspectors whose activities under Office of Inspector General were official and public, the appointment and activities of secret royal inspectors were kept strictly secret throughout the mission.

Position description 
Generally, young officials (usually in their thirties) of low or middle rank were appointed as secret royal inspectors because they had to travel long distance for an extended period of time. Young officials were also more likely to have strong sense of justice and less likely to have personal connection with local officials. Even though secret royal inspector was a temporary position (and young men of lower rank were appointed to it), its authority was equivalent to a governor (highest-ranking local official) and he had the power to dismiss local officials including governor in the name of the king.

For their secret mission, they received a letter of appointment (bongseo, 봉서), a description of their destination and mission (samok, 사목), and "horse requisition tablet" called mapae(마패), which they used to requisite horses and men from a local station run by the central government. To ensure secrecy of the mission, a secret royal inspector could open bongseo only after leaving the capital. When they arrived at the assigned district, they surveyed the area in disguise. After the secret surveillance was completed, they revealed themselves by presenting mapae or bongseo and inspected the magistrate's office and records. If they found cases that were unjustly judged, they presided in retrial to redress wrongs. After the completion of their mission, inspectors returned to the capital and presented a report to the king – detailing wrongs committed by former and active local officials, reporting on the mood of the populace, and recommending hidden talents for appointment and virtuous villagers for award.

The title is mentioned for the first time in 1555 during Myeongjong's reign, but it already existed as early as 1509 during Jungjong's reign. The activities of secret royal inspectors became more frequent and prevalent during late Joseon period. The last secret royal inspector was Yi Myeon-sang, who served in Jeolla province in 1892.

The secret inspector system was very effective in reducing corruption in provinces, but it also had many problems. According to one account, the survival rate of secret royal inspectors was only 30 percent. Sometimes they fell victim to wild animals, bandits, or assassins sent by a corrupt official. In addition, secret royal inspectors had to pay expenses for the mission out of their pocket. Therefore, a secret royal inspector sometimes had to pose as a beggar more out of necessity than for sake of secrecy. After Sukjong's time, secret royal inspector system was also abused as a weapon in factional fighting.

Since the Middle Joseon period, about 670 secret royal inspectors went into action. Famous figures who served as secret royal inspectors include Jo Gwang-jo, Yi Hwang, Jeong Yak-yong, and writer Kim Man-jung. Yi Sibal (during Seonjo's reign), Yi Geon-chang (during Gojong's reign) and especially Park Mun-su (during Yeongjo's reign) are famous for their work as secret royal inspector. Secret royal inspectors were popular subject for fiction in both Joseon period and modern times. Many legends about Park Mun-su as the avenger for the people exploited by corrupt officials have passed down through folk tales (There are 300 such stories). The exploits of secret royal inspector were featured in popular Joseon-era novel, Chunhyangjeon. In recent years, the 1981–1983 TV series 'Secret Royal Inspector', the 2002 TV series 'Inspector Park Mun-su,' 2009 TV series 'Tamra, Island,' and several film adaptations of Chunhyangjeon have secret royal inspector as their main protagonist. 

"Undercover royal inspector" is more literal and accurate translation of Amhaeng-eosa, but it is more frequently translated as secret royal inspector.

"amhaeng" can be literly transaltaed into "dark maneuver" usually can be translated into "undercover" and "eosa" can be translated into "government officer".

In popular culture
The position of secret royal inspector is prominent in the Korean folk tale of Chunhyangjeon, which is perhaps the most famous Korean folk tale. The role of the secret royal inspector has been depicted in historical South Korean dramas. In Royal Secret Agent, a 2020 historical comedy television series, Kim Myung-soo portrayed the character of a secret royal inspector. In 2021, Ok Taec-yeon portrayed the character of a secret royal inspector in the historical comedy television series Secret Royal Inspector & Joy.

References 

Joseon dynasty
Ombudsman posts